Referendum L was a referendum in Colorado, USA in 2008, to lower the age requirement to participate in the Colorado State Legislature from 25 to 21. The measure was rejected by voters 53.7% to 46.3% on November 4, 2008.

See also 
List of Colorado ballot measures

Results

References

External links 
Referendum L: Age Qualification for Serving in General Assembly - Full Text (PDF)

Referendum L